Ekklisia Profitis Ilias is a church on the Greek Island of Santorini. The church lies on the coastal hiking trail between the towns of Oia and Fira.

References 

Churches in Santorini